Oronzo Reale (24 October 1902 – 14 July 1988) was an Italian politician, who served as justice minister in the 1960s and 1970s.

Biography
Reale was born in Lecce on 24 October 1902. He received a degree in law.

He was a member and the head of the Republican Party. He served as the secretary of the party. In the 1970s he tried the French model to reorganize the party for which he set up a committee.

Reale also assumed cabinet posts. On 4 December 1963, he became justice minister of Italy. He was reappointed justice minister to the coalition government led by Prime Minister Aldo Moro on 24 February 1966. His term ended on 24 June 1968. Then Reale served as the minister of finance from 12 December 1968 to 5 August 1969.

He was secondly appointed justice minister on 27 March 1970 and served in the post until March 1971. His third and last term as justice minister was from 23 November 1974 to 12 February 1976. During his third term as justice minister, Reale developed a public law order, called Legge Reale or more formally public law order 152 which was introduced on 22 May 1975 as a response to bombings organized by right-wing groups in Brescia. The law expanded the powers of Italian security forces.

Reale died on 14 July 1988, aged 85.

References

External links

1902 births
1988 deaths
Action Party (Italy) politicians
Italian Republican Party politicians
Italian Ministers of Justice
Finance ministers of Italy
Members of the National Council (Italy)
Deputies of Legislature III of Italy
Deputies of Legislature IV of Italy
Deputies of Legislature V of Italy
Deputies of Legislature VI of Italy
People from Lecce
Politicians of Apulia
Knights Grand Cross of the Order of Merit of the Italian Republic